Hoplomyzon papillatus is a species of banjo catfish found in Ecuador and Venezuela where it occurs in the Napo and Portuguesa River basins respectively.  It grows to a length of 1.7 cm.

References 
 

Aspredinidae
Fish of Venezuela
Fish of Ecuador
Fish described in 1985